The Isosceles shooting stance is a shooting technique for handguns. It became popular in the 1980s when Brian Enos and Rob Leatham started using it to win International Practical Shooting Confederation competitions. It is one of the two main stances for pistol shooting alongside the Weaver stance.

Description 

The Isosceles Stance is a two-handed technique in which the dominant hand holds the pistol or revolver while the support hand wraps around the dominant hand. Both arms are held straight, locking the elbows. Viewed from above, the arms and chest of the shooter describe an isosceles triangle (a triangle with two equal sides, from Greek iso "equal, uniform" and skelos "leg"), which gives the stance its name.

The Isosceles Stance passively absorbs the recoil of firing the handgun using the shooter's skeletal structure, rather than active muscular tension, as in other shooting stances, like the Weaver Stance.

The Isosceles Stance is a simple stance, and is natural to perform under stress. Because the Isosceles Stance orients the torso of the shooter forward, it increases the usefulness of a ballistic vest compared to other shooting stances, which tend to present the less protected side of the torso, but also provides a larger target in the process.

Modern Isosceles 

The Modern Isosceles shooting stance is a more aggressive, forward-leaning version of the Traditional Isosceles. The shooter places the shoulders forward of the hips, the feet shoulder width apart, support-side foot slightly forward, and the knees bent. These changes to posture shift the center of mass forward, helping the shooter better control recoil.

References

External links 

http://www.gunsandammo.com/2012/10/09/which-is-better-the-isosceles-or-weaver-stance/

Firearm techniques